Ariel Engle is a Canadian indie pop singer and songwriter who records and performs as a solo artist and with Broken Social Scene.

Engle first became noted as a guest vocalist on Montag's 2005 album Alone, Not Alone, performing vocals on the track "Grand Luxe". She subsequently appeared as a guest or backing vocalist on recordings by Melissa Auf der Maur, Snowblink, Land of Kush, Plants and Animals, Stars and Martha Wainwright before collaborating with her husband, Broken Social Scene's Andrew Whiteman, on the band project AroarA. The band's 2013 EP In the Pines, based on the poetry of Alice Notley, was a longlisted nominee for the 2014 Polaris Music Prize.

Following In the Pines, Engle became a member of Broken Social Scene, often serving as a live fill-in vocalist on songs that had been sung on record by Feist, Amy Millan or Emily Haines. The 2017 album Hug of Thunder marked her first recorded appearance on a Broken Social Scene album.

In 2018, Engle launched the solo project La Force. Her self-titled debut album as La Force was released in September 2018 on Arts & Crafts Productions. In the same year, she appeared on Safia Nolin's album Dans le noir as a duet vocalist on the track "Lesbian Break-Up Song". La Force was a longlisted nominee for the 2019 Polaris Music Prize.

References

21st-century Canadian women singers
Canadian indie rock musicians
Canadian indie pop musicians
Broken Social Scene members
Arts & Crafts Productions artists
Singers from Montreal
Living people
Year of birth missing (living people)
Canadian women pop singers
Canadian women rock singers